Gadsup is a Kainantu language spoken by the people of the same name in Papua New Guinea.

Phonology

Consonants 

 /ɸ, β, s, ɾ, x/ become plosives [p, b, t, d, k] when preceded by /N, ʔ/, but initially and medially they are fricatives or [ɾ].

The phonology of Akuna Gadsup is similar to Ontena Gadsup, except voiceless plosives don't leniate initially, but they do medially.

Vowels 

References

External links 
 Paradisec open access vocabulary and phrases in Gadsup
 Paradisec open access audio recordings in Gadsup

Kainantu–Goroka languages
Languages of Eastern Highlands Province